Aelia acuminata, common name Bishop's Mitre, is a species of shield bug belonging to the family Pentatomidae.

Distribution
This species is present in most of Europe, in North Africa and in Northern Asia (excluding China).

Habitat
These shield bugs mainly inhabit dry meadows and fields of cereals. They occurs in the Alps up to about 1300 meters above sea level.

Description
These bugs have a slightly elongated body, with a pointed head (hence the species name acuminata). The basic body color is light brown  with darker brown longitudinal. The nymphs are already rather similar to the adults, although they are still wingless.

Biology
Aelia acuminata is a univoltine species. They have five nymphal stages in their development. Adults overwinter in litter or thickets. These bugs are herbivorous, feeding on various wild grasses and cereals. They suck many different types of grasses (Poaceae), mainly Festuca, Poa, Agrostis, Dactylis, Lolium and Bromus species. They can cause significant damage in cereal fields.

Gallery

Bibliography
 Michael Chinery, Insectes de France et d'Europe occidentale, Paris, Flammarion, août 2012, 320 p., p. 72-73
 Amyot, C. J. B., and Audinet Serville (1843), Histoire Naturelle des Insectes Hémiptères
 Ruiz, D., M. Goula, E. Infiesta, T. Monleón, M. Pujol, and E. Gordún (2003) Guía de identificación de los chinches de los cereales (Insecta, Heteroptera) encontrados en los trigos españoles, Boletín de Sanidad Vegetal, vol. 29, no. 4

References

Aelini
Hemiptera of Europe
Articles containing video clips
Bugs described in 1758
Taxa named by Carl Linnaeus